Lipina is a rural locality in Dolzhenkovsky Selsoviet Rural Settlement, Oktyabrsky District, Kursk Oblast, Russia. Population:

Geography 
The village is located on the Seym River (a left tributary of the Desna), 69 km from the Russia–Ukraine border, 21 km south-west of Kursk, 6 km north-west of the district center – the urban-type settlement Pryamitsyno, 3.5 km from the selsoviet center – Bolshoye Dolzhenkovo.

 Climate
Lipina has a warm-summer humid continental climate (Dfb in the Köppen climate classification).

Transport 
Lipina is located 16 km from the federal route  Crimea Highway (a part of the European route ), 2.5 km from the road of regional importance  (Kursk – Lgov – Rylsk – border with Ukraine), 3 km from the road of intermunicipal significance  (Dyakonovo – Starkovo – Sokolovka), on the road  (38N-073 – Bolshoye Dolzhenkovo via Avdeyeva), 4 km from the nearest railway halt 439 km (railway line Lgov I — Kursk).

The rural locality is situated 33 km from Kursk Vostochny Airport, 124 km from Belgorod International Airport and 235 km from Voronezh Peter the Great Airport.

References

Notes

Sources

Rural localities in Oktyabrsky District, Kursk Oblast